DNA was the name taken by English electronic music producers Nick Batt and Neal Slateford, best known for releasing a remix of Suzanne Vega's "Tom's Diner" in 1990.

As well as "Tom's Diner", the duo remixed two other Suzanne Vega tracks: "Rusted Pipe" in 1991, and a radio mix of "Rosemary" in 2000. After a brief lull, the duo reappeared with a mix of the Loreena McKennitt track "The Mummers' Dance", which reached number one on the US Billboard Hot 100 Airplay chart in 1997.

Batt worked extensively with Goldfrapp on their albums Felt Mountain, Black Cherry and Supernature, receiving an Ivor Novello Award for co-writing the Black Cherry track "Strict Machine".

Personnel
Neal Slateford (born in Bath), co-founder of Lovehoney.
Nick Batt (born Nicholas Batt, lives in Bath), now running the Sonic State music technology website and podcast.

Discography and remixography

Albums
Taste This, EMI (1992) (co-produced by Neil Davidge)
Remixes, Polydor (1992) (co-produced by Neil Davidge)

Singles

Other remixes:
1990: "Love and Affection" – Sinitta
1991: "Ride the Bullet" (Remix) – Army of Lovers (appears on the CD maxi-single of "Crucified")
1991: "Get the Message" (1991) – Electronic
1991: "Running Back to You" (Remix) – Vanessa L. Williams
1993: "Light of the World" (1993) – Kim Appleby
1995: "I Specialize in Love" – Exposé (remixed by Darrin Friedman, original found on 1992 album Exposé)
1997: "The Mummers' Dance" (Single version) – Loreena McKennitt
1998: "Coconut" – Dannii Minogue (remixed by Flexifinger, original found on The 1995 Sessions)

References

External links
 Nick Batt at Discogs
 SonicState on YouTube

English record producers
Musical groups established in 1988
Musical groups disestablished in 1998
Musical groups from Somerset
English electronic music duos
British record production teams
Record production duos
Remixers
EMI Records artists
Polydor Records artists